This article presents a list of counties of Albania by Human Development Index (HDI), which is a comparative measure of life expectancy, education, literacy, standard of living, per capita income and overall well-being of the citizens in each counties of Albania.

Human Development Index

Methodology 

Introduced by the United Nations Development Programme (UNDP) in 1990, the Human Development Index (HDI) is a composite statistic of education, income and longevity indices, calculated in order to measure social and economic development within countries. It consists of a number between 0 and 1, comprising five tiers of human development—very low, low, medium, high, or very high—wherein the development is considered higher when closer to 1. According to the latest Human Development Report, published in 2023 and reflecting data from 2021, Albania placed List of countries by Human Development Index
67 among 189 countries with an HDI value of 0.796.

See also 
 Counties of Albania
 List of countries by Human Development Index

References 

Counties By Hdi
 
Albania
Albania